Aspidosperma darienense is a species of plant in the family Apocynaceae. It is native to Panama, Colombia, Ecuador, French Guiana, and northern Brazil.  It is threatened by habitat loss.

References

Flora of Panama
Flora of South America
darienense
Endangered plants
Plants described in 1966
Taxonomy articles created by Polbot